Cushman may refer to:

Cushman (name)
Cushman (company), an American vehicle manufacturer
Cushman (mango), a mango cultivar

Places in the United States 
Cushman, Arkansas, a city in Arkansas
Cushman, Michigan, a ghost town
Cushman, Oregon, a city in Oregon
Lake Cushman, Washington, a city in the state of Washington
Lake Cushman, a lake in Washington
Cushman Dam No. 1, a dam that forms Lake Cushman
Cushman Dam No. 2, a dam that forms Lake Kokanee

See also 
Cushman & Wakefield, a real estate firm
Robert Cushman Murphy Junior High School
The Cushman School, Miami, Florida, US